Poplar Airport  is a public use airport located in Poplar, a town in Roosevelt County, Montana, United States. The airport is owned by Town of Poplar and Roosevelt County. It is included in the National Plan of Integrated Airport Systems for 2009–2013, which categorized it as a general aviation facility.

Facilities and aircraft 
Poplar Airport covers an area of 69 acres (28 ha) at an elevation of 2,005 feet (611 m) above mean sea level. It has one runway designated 9/27 which has an asphalt surface measuring is 3,030 by 60 feet (924 x 18 m).

For the 12-month period ending July 25, 2006, the airport had 5,150 aircraft operations, an average of 14 per day: 61% general aviation, 37% air taxi, and 2% military. At that time there were eight aircraft based at this airport: 88% single-engine and 13% multi-engine.

See also 
 List of airports in Montana

References

External links 
 Aerial image as of July 1996 from USGS The National Map
 

Defunct airports in the United States
Airports in Montana
Buildings and structures in Roosevelt County, Montana
Transportation in Roosevelt County, Montana